Alfred Ollivant (1874–1927) was an English novelist known best for his novel Owd Bob. Ollivant also published about a dozen other novels ranging from small-scale cautionary tales to grand historical stories.

Alfred Ollivant was born in Nuthurst, Sussex, in 1874 and became an author after a horse-riding injury ended his brief military career. Owd Bob, his first novel, was published in 1898. Set in rural Cumbria, in northern England, the novel concerns a suspected sheepkilling collie, Bob. Even though most of the book's dialogue is written in the Cumbrian dialect, it became popular in the United States. Ollivant published a sequel, Danny, in 1902. He was also a short story contributor to the magazines The Atlantic Monthly and the Boston Evening Transcript. Alfred Ollivant died in London on 19 January 1927.

Bibliography
Owd Bob - Being the story of Bob, son of Battle, the last of the grey dogs of Kenmuir (1898)
Danny (1902)
The Redcoat Captain: A Story of that Country (1907)
The Gentleman: A Romance of the Sea (1908)
The Taming of John Blunt (1911)
The Royal Road (1912)
The Brown Mare, and other studies of England under the cloud (1916)
Boy Woodburn: A story of the Sussex Downs (1917)	
Two Men: A romance of Sussex (1919)
One Woman: Being the second part of a romance of Sussex (1921)
Devil Dare (1923)
"Old For-ever": an epic of beyond the Indus (1923)
Boxer & Beauty: A tale of two cart-horses (1924)
Tomorrow (1927)
The Next Step, an essay on the missing policeman dedicated to the masses of mankind, silent and suffering (1919)

External links 
 
 

20th-century English novelists
1927 deaths
1874 births
English male novelists
20th-century English male writers